The Lone Wolf Takes a Chance is a 1941 American mystery film directed by Sidney Salkow, which stars Warren William, June Storey, and Henry Wilcoxon. Salkow also wrote the original screenplay, along with Earl Felton, and the film was released on March 6, 1941. It is the sixth Lone Wolf film produced by Columbia Pictures, and the fourth appearance of William as the title character Lone Wolf.

Cast list

References

External links
 
 
 

Columbia Pictures films
Films directed by Sidney Salkow
1940s mystery drama films
American mystery drama films
1940s English-language films
American black-and-white films
1941 drama films
1941 films
The Lone Wolf films
1940s American films